Michael Bell (March 18, 1971 – December 14, 2008) was an American professional wrestler who worked for the World Wrestling Federation (WWF) and the original Extreme Championship Wrestling (ECW) as Mike "Mad Dog" Bell. He was the brother of Mark Bell and Chris Bell director of the 2008 documentary, Bigger, Stronger, Faster, and the 2015 follow up documentary, Prescription Thugs, in which Mike Bell's life and death by prescription drugs are explored.

Early life
Michael Bell was born on March 18, 1971, in Poughkeepsie, New York. He struggled with weight issues as a child and was called "Pugsley" whenever he entered his school bus, which inspired him to begin weight lifting and playing football. Bell got his nickname “Mad Dog” by beating up the bullies that teased him during school. Eventually, Bell became captain of his high school football team, and enrolled at the University of Cincinnati on a football scholarship. Bell played Division I football until a knee injury ended his aspirations.

In college, when Bell thought he was no longer his football team's biggest and strongest player, he switched to wrestling as he grew up watching the sport. He and his brothers would often imitate the moves they saw on television. He was trained by David Schultz and Paul Roma.

Professional wrestling career

World Wrestling Federation/Entertainment (1992–2003)
Bell worked as a jobber for WWE (then-designated, the World Wrestling Federation, or, WWF) during the early-1990s, even performing on its flagship TV show, Monday Night Raw. Like many jobbers of that era, Bell worked on a match-by-match substructure for the WWF, never being under continuous contract with the promotion. He would occasionally tag team with fellow jobber Tony DeVito, even teaming with him upon Bell's debut, where they lost to The Natural Disasters.

Bell faced various wrestlers such as The Undertaker, Razor Ramon, The 1-2-3 Kid, and Owen Hart, all in a losing effort. During his time in the company, he additionally used steroids to stand out against the other wrestlers, but this further led to increasing drug use and depression. This was featured in the documentary Bigger, Stronger, Faster. It can also be seen in Prescription Thugs, a documentary created by his brother about prescription drug abuse in America. As the company stopped calling and Bell never obtained a full time contract, he said "I had a bottle of liquid lead, a bottle of nyquil, and like four boxes of sleeping pills. I went down to the river, down by the railroad tracks, parked my car and took everything. There’s no way I should be alive right now", indicating he was going to commit suicide.

Aside from his run in the 90s, Bell was best known in the wrestling community for an incident with Perry Saturn during a taped WWF match for Jakked/Metal on May 17, 2001. Bell and Saturn both botched a snapmare armdrag, causing Saturn to land on the mat head first. Saturn legitimately attacked Bell in retaliation for this perceived lack of professionalism and in-ring ethic, at one point tossing Bell out of the ring and causing Bell himself to land on his head on the safety mat. Neither performer sustained serious injury, and both were able to resume their respective roles and finish the match as planned, without most spectators realizing what had actually happened. Saturn would be punished by management for the incident as he would suffer a kayfabe concussion and fall in love with a mop aptly named Moppy. Bell's final match with the company was on October 13, 2003, where he and brother Mark teamed up to face Garrison Cade and Mark Jindrak in a losing effort.

Extreme Championship Wrestling (2000–2001) 
Bell later worked with the original ECW. He performed at the Mid-Hudson Civic Center during his time in the company. He faced the likes of Chilly Willy, Matt Bentley, and Balls Mahoney in 2000, and Billy Wiles in 2001, all in a losing effort.

Later career (2001–2007) 
In Eastern Wrestling Alliance, Bell and Tony DeVito reunited to form The Pasagoula Shipbuilders. They constantly lost to The Power Company, a tag team consisting of Dave Power and Dean Power. Bell won his first ever title in Ultimate Pro Wrestling, the heavyweight championship, by defeating Aaron Baker. He also teamed with brother Mark as Hell's Bells, where they lost to The Definition Of Pain and The Big Time. He was defeated by King Kong Bundy in USA Wrestling during its Mikey Whipwreck retirement show. He was defeated by Psycho Sam and Tom Marquez at ICW No Holds Barred. 

He was defeated by Phoenix in the North American Wrestling Alliance. In the World Wrestling Alliance, he defeated Danger and Vik Dalishus, also defeating The Texas Outlaw & Dalishus while teaming with Diablo Santiago. He also defeated Ronnie Garvin. At Assault Championship Wrestling, he defeated Shamir Hussein and Luis Ortiz. At Ohio Valley Wrestling, he lost to Big Bad John and the tag team Adrenaline. Hell's Bell's were defeated by Johnny Jeter & Seven, and Bell lost a 2,500 Dollar Battle Royale. At Defiant Pro Wrestling, he was defeated by his former partner Tony DeVito. His final match was at Ultimate Pro Wrestling, a four corners match, where he was defeated by Kid Vicious, on January 27, 2007.

Death
On December 14, 2008, he was found dead at a rehabilitation facility in Costa Mesa, California. It was ruled that he died of an inhalation-induced heart attack brought on by inhalation of difluoroethane in Dust-Off, a compressed gas product used for cleaning objects such as computer keyboards. Bell was 37 years old.

Following his death, his brother Chris said "He was always wrestling, he was a personal trainer, he was always pushing his body to the max. You can’t really blame wrestling, but it’s kind of the lifestyle." “You have a couple of painkillers to get to the next match, have a couple drinks night to night and it gets out of hand." WWE released a statement saying "Although Mr. Bell was never under a WWE contract, WWE extends its deepest condolences to the Bell family."

Championships and accomplishments
Ultimate Pro Wrestling
UPW Heavyweight Championship (1 time)

See also
 List of premature professional wrestling deaths

References

External links
Mike "Mad Dog" Bell Obituary

1971 births
2008 deaths
20th-century professional wrestlers
21st-century professional wrestlers
Accidental deaths in California
American male professional wrestlers
Professional wrestlers from New York (state)
Sportspeople from Poughkeepsie, New York